Shiraz is a constituency for the Islamic Consultative Assembly.

Elections

10th term 
1st round

1st round

References 

Electoral districts of Iran
Shiraz
2006 establishments in Iran